The Invisible Army is a 1945 Danish war film directed by Johan Jacobsen and starring Bodil Kjer.

Cast
 Bodil Kjer as Alice
 Ebbe Rode as Jørgen
 Mogens Wieth as Poul
 Maria Garland as Alices mor
 Poul Müller as Michelsen
 Asbjørn Andersen as Direktøren
 Henry Nielsen as Portner på Metrodan
 Jakob Nielsen as Værkfører på Metrodan
 Ole Monty as Betjent
 Svend Methling as Præst
 Lau Lauritzen as Tysk Kriminalrat
 Edvin Tiemroth as Modstandsmand
 Buster Larsen as Modstandsmand
 Kjeld Petersen as Modstandsmand
 Kjeld Jacobsen as Mand der fortæller rygte videre
 Preben Mahrt as Mand der fortæller rygte videre
 Gyrd Løfquist
 Karl Jørgensen
 Steen Gregers
 Valdemar Skjerning as Politimester
 Ellen Margrethe Stein as Georges mor
 Sigurd Langberg as Georges far
 Aage Foss
 Carl Johan Hviid as Viktor Emilius Sørensen
 Poul Reichhardt as Modstandsmand

References

External links

1945 films
1940s Danish-language films
Danish black-and-white films
Films directed by Johan Jacobsen
Danish World War II films
1945 war films
Films about Danish resistance movement